Springfield railway line is a  suburban railway line in Brisbane, Australia that branches from the Ipswich/Rosewood line after Darra railway station. The line was developed along with the widening of the nearby Centenary Motorway.

However, only the interurban multiple unit 100 and 120 series and New Generation Rollingstock trains can run at the full speed of the line.

Services on this line are the busiest on the Brisbane network.

Construction and opening

The line was developed along with the widening of the nearby Centenary Motorway from two to four lanes from Darra through to the Logan Motorway. The original completion date was for 2015. However this was bought forward to 2013.

On , work started on the second stage of the line to Springfield. The station originally proposed as Springfield Lakes station was renamed Springfield, and the one proposed as Springfield station renamed Springfield Central.

The extension to Springfield Central began service on 2 December 2013.

A proposal exists to extend the line from its present terminus at Springfield Central to Redbank Plains, Ripley Valley, Yamanto, and Ipswich station.

Route

Passengers would change for or from the Ipswich and Rosewood lines at Darra; Beenleigh, Gold Coast and Cleveland lines at Roma Street; and all other lines at Central.

The viaduct has been designed so that its piers do not obstruct planned expansions of both roads.

Proposed extensions
In the Connecting SEQ 2031 Plan, the QLD Government has listed an UrbanLink high frequency (15min) service running from Darra to Springfield, and on to Redbank Plains via Augustine Heights, as an extension to the existing Springfield Line. It also talks about an ExpressLink (30min frequency) between Ipswich and Ripley, via UQ Ipswich (now USQ Ipswich), Churchill, Yamanto and Deebing Heights; with the vital corridor between Ripley and Redbank plains being reserved for a later time after 2031. In 2019, the City of Ipswich completed an overview of the Ipswich Central to Springfield Central public transport corridor with a focus on the proposed extension.

The lines are shown in the map below.

See also

South East Queensland Infrastructure Plan and Program

References

External links
 Queensland Rail – Darra to Springfield Transport Corridor – Stage 1
Queensland Rail – Darra to Springfield Transport Corridor – Stage 2
TransLink - About trains

Brisbane railway lines
Public transport in Brisbane
2013 establishments in Australia
Railway lines opened in 2013
Ipswich, Queensland